Area codes 702 and 725 are telephone area codes in the North American Numbering Plan (NANP) for Clark County, including Las Vegas, in the U.S. state of Nevada. Area code 702 was one of the original North American area codes established in October 1947, and serviced the entire state of Nevada until 1998, when it was reduced to Las Vegas and the surrounding area. In 2014, area code 725 was added as an overlay plan covering the same area.

History
702 was the sole area code for all of Nevada until December 12, 1998. On that date, almost all of the state outside Clark County, including Reno and Carson City, was assigned area code 775. Nevada's explosive growth in the second half of the 20th century, and the corresponding expansion of telephone service, would have made a second area code a must in any event. However, the split was hastened by the proliferation of cell phones and pagers, particularly in Las Vegas, Reno, and Carson City.

The split followed rumors that area code 777, corresponding to the winning number combination for some slot machines, was considered for Las Vegas. However, the telecommunications industry ruled out assigning an easily recognizable area code, so that it be reserved in the event it was needed nationally.

Since May 3, 2014, area code 702 has been overlaid with area code 725. Ten-digit dialing is required for all calls, with exceptions for landline-based callers calling long distance within the county, for which "1" must be dialed first.

Despite Las Vegas' continued rapid growth, 702/725 is nowhere near exhaustion. Projections in 2017 suggested that the Las Vegas area would not need another area code until late 2045 at the earliest. However, in October 2019, there was no exhaust date for 702/725. In April 2021, the exhaust date is 2055.

See also
 List of NANP area codes
 List of Nevada area codes

References

External links

 List of exchanges from RealPhoneLookup.com, 702 Area Code

702 725
702 725